Derrick Harden (born April 21, 1964) is a former American football wide receiver in the National Football League for the Green Bay Packers (1987). He played at the collegiate level at Eastern New Mexico University.

See also
Green Bay Packers players

References

1964 births
Living people
Players of American football from Milwaukee
American football wide receivers
Eastern New Mexico Greyhounds football players
Green Bay Packers players
South Division High School alumni